Jean-Pierre Schoebel (born 18 March 1949) is a French athlete. He competed in the men's decathlon at the 1972 Summer Olympics.

References

External links
 

1949 births
Living people
Athletes (track and field) at the 1972 Summer Olympics
French decathletes
Olympic athletes of France
Sportspeople from Grenoble